Friend of Mine is a folk album by Iowa-born singer/songwriter Greg Brown and New England singer/songwriter Bill Morrissey.

Reception

Writing for Allmusic, music critic Alex Henderson called the album "... an unpretentious date that followers of both artists will appreciate."

Track listing
 "Ain't Life a Brook" (Ferron)
 "Little Red Rooster" (Burnett, Dixon)
 "He Was a Friend of Mine" (Traditional)
 "Memphis, Tennessee" (Berry)
 "The Road" (Danny O'Keefe)
 "You Can't Always Get What You Want" (Mick Jagger, Keith Richards)
 "Duncan and Brady" (Traditional)
 "Tom Dula" (Morrissey, Proffitt)
 "Summer Wages" (Tyson, Witmark)
 "I'll Never Get Out of This World Alive" (Rose, Hank Williams)
 "Fishing with Bill" (Brown)
 "Baby, Please Don't Go" (Williams)

Personnel
Greg Brown – vocals, guitar, harmonica
Bill Morrissey – vocals, guitar, harmonica, slide guitar
Billy Conway – drums
Richard Gates – bass
Ed Sheridan – bass

Production
Produced by Ellen Karas
Engineered by Jesse Henderson
Mastered by Dr. Toby Mountain

References

Greg Brown (folk musician) albums
1993 albums
Collaborative albums